In the mythology of Tonga, Havea Hikuleo is the goddess of the world, Pulotu. The islands of Kao, Tofua, Hunga Haapai, Hunga Tonga, Late and Fonualei came from stones thrown down from the skies by Hikuleo. They are all volcanic islands. The other, (coral) islands were fished up by her brother or cousin Maui.

Mythology
Hikuleʻo's ancestors were, according to one source, the god Pil'e (Limu according to others) and the goddess Kele, who came from Pulotu and created the mythical land of Tongamamaʻo for their children to dwell in. They had a son Toiukamea "Hidden Iron" and a daughter Māʻimoaʻalōngona "Royal Game of Hearing" who married each other and had children. This pair seems to be a modern invention, since ukamea "iron" is a word that postdates European contact; other informants leave out this generation.

Among their children were many sons, the boy Taufulifonua and the girl Havea Lolofonua. One day they lay on the beach, naked, as they were still innocent, with their legs in the sea. The tide rose and the water covered them more and more. Then an oʻo ("penetrate") fish swam along and started to suck from the girl's labia, which caused her a lot of joy. Once the fish had been chased away the boy tried to gently stroke her inflicted parts but that did not give her relief. Then instead of his hand, he tried it with his penis, and suddenly the girl was consoled. So copulation was invented, and Havea Hikuleʻo was the first of many children.

Meanwhile, Taufulifonua and Havea Lolofonua's younger brother and sister, also twins, also married each other. They were named Fonuʻuta "Land Turtle" and Fonutahi "Sea Turtle" and their child was Maui (Maui Motuʻa, that is; if he was not the child of Taufulifonua and Havea Lolofonua themselves). And the next younger brother and sister, also twins who married each other, were Velesiʻi "Small Enticer" and Velelahi "Big Enticer", who brought forth Tangaloa (Tangaloa ʻEiki, that is).

When Taufulifonua had become old and close to death, he divided the universe: Tangaloa got the sky to rule, Maui the earth, and Havea Hikuleʻo became the lord of Pulotu.

Tangaloa's descendants would become later the (divine) Tuʻi Tonga starting with ʻAhoʻeitu. Maui's line became the Tuʻi Talau, while Hikuleʻo's offspring was Loʻau, and the ancestry of the Tuʻi Haʻatakalaua.

The historical interpretation of this triumvirate (Hikuleʻo, Maui, Tangaloa) may be a struggle to liberate Tonga from the dominance of the Tuʻi Pulotu empire in Fiji, after which the victors could divide the spoils. Or theoretically they could have been Sāmoans, which made would have made Tonga and Fiji part of the so-called Tuʻi Manuʻa empire. But without credible evidence or claim, it is still a mystery whether Tu'i Manu'a even existed or had power over the isles of Tonga, Fiji or any other.

In popular culture
Tongan American professional wrestler Taula Fifita performs under the ring name "HIKULEO".

See also
Saveasiʻuleo

Notes

However, u'amea in Sāmoan is also an archaic word for a type of lava (known in Hawai'i as ʻaʻā), from u'a ("viscous, glutinous") and mea ("red-brown," as in the color of the manumea, the "reddish-brown bird"). U'a was used in colonial times to refer to iron because it turns the same color ("mea") as it oxidizes.

References
E.W. Gifford, Tongan myths and tales, BPB Bulletin 8, 1924
I.F. Helu, Tohi vete, Atenisi, 2006

Tongan deities
Polynesian goddesses